Milan has an extensive internal transport network and is also an important transportation node in Italy, being one of the country's biggest hubs for air, rail and road networks. 
Internal public transport network includes the Metro, the Suburban Railway, the tram and bus network, as well as taxi, car and bike sharing services.

History
Early public transport service in Milan dates back to 1801, operated with horse-drawn carriages. After the relocation of the capital of the Italian Kingdom to Milan in 1805, national and international transport services were inaugurated, all operated with carriages, to Vienna, Marseille and several Italian cities.
Transport via the Navigli canals was also an important transport mode in that period.

The first bus line was opened in 1827, connecting Milan to Lodi. The first railway, to Monza, was inaugurated in 1840.

Public transportation

Metro

The Milan Metro is a rapid transit system, running mainly underground, serving Milan and other surrounding cities. The network consists of 5 lines, identified by different colors and numbers:

The system carries about 1.15 million passengers per day.

Suburban rail 

 
The suburban railway service consists of 11 lines connecting Milan to the greater metropolitan area:

The system was brought together from existing lines and the construction of the new Passante, an underground railway line passing through the city. The service began operation in 2004 and now comprises 124 stations. Several extensions are planned.

Trams

The Tram network comprises 17 urban lines. The system is more than 170 km long and is the biggest network in Italy.

The Milan tram network dates back to 1876, when the first horse driven tram line began operation. In 1878 the first steam powered tram was launched and by 1901 all the lines were electric powered. In 1910 line numbers were first introduced. At that time the network was already consisting of 30 lines. Until 1917 the tram system was operated by several different companies, however, since that year the municipality took control over the whole network.

In the 1920s the famous Class 1500 streetcars were introduced. Many of them, restored, are still in use today.

Beginning from the late 1950s and until the end of the 1970s the tram network was reduced, being replaced in some areas by the new Metro lines or by bus lines.

Buses
 
There are 68 bus and 4 trolleybus lines in Milan. Most of the routes do not run during the night, however, bus services on demand are available in the weekend at night.

New night bus lines during weekends have been introduced since 24 September 2011, running from 2 am to 6 am on Fridays and Saturdays. The new network was considered a success, with more than 8,000 people using the lines every weekend.

Public transport statistics
The average amount of time people spend commuting with public transit in Milan on a weekday is 64 min. 
14% of public transit riders ride for more than 2 hours every day. 
The average amount of time people wait at a stop or station for public transit is 11 min, while 12% of riders wait for over 20 minutes on average every day. 
The average distance people usually ride in a single trip with public transit is 7.7 km, while 14% travel for over 12 km in a single direction.

National and international rail

Milan is one of the most important hubs for the national and international rail network in Italy. Milan Central station is the second station in Italy both for size and passengers after Rome. It is also the main node for high-speed rail lines in northern Italy. Milano Cadorna and Milano Porta Garibaldi stations are respectively the seventh and the eleventh busiest stations in Italy. Because of its position, Milan is also the main gateway for international passenger traffic to Europe. Daily international destinations include Bern, Lugano, Geneve, Zurich, Paris, Nice, Marseille, Wien, Barcelona and Munich.

Milan is also the core of Lombardy's regional train network. Regional trains were operated on two different systems by LeNord (departing from Milano Cadorna) and Trenitalia (departing from Milan Centrale and Milano Porta Garibaldi). Beginning in 2011, a new company, Trenord, operates both Trenitalia and LeNord regional trains in Lombardy.

Roads

Milan is a key node for the Italian road network, being the junction between the east-west A4 highway to Turin and Venice and the north-south A1 highway to Rome and Naples. Other important highways, such as the A7 to Genova and the A8-A9 to Switzerland, also serve the city. Highways reaching Milan are linked together by a ring road formed by the 3 tangenziali (the A50, A51 and A52) and part of the A4 highway, with a total length of over 100 km around the city.

Milan road system is characterized by a high rate of traffic congestion, due to a high level of cars per capita and a high number of commuters in the metropolitan area. Congested traffic is also responsible for the high pollution rate in the Milan area. Counter measures included the partial ban of private cars inside the Milan urban area for some period, usually during Sundays. 
In 2008, a traffic pollution charge for vehicles entering the city, Ecopass, was introduced.
The program resulted in a lower proportion of highly polluting vehicles on the roads in the city. However, the program progressively lost effectiveness as the city's vehicle fleet got greener. 
Since 16 January 2012 a new program, Area C, was introduced as a congestion charge (as opposed to the previous pollution charge), thus targeting any private vehicle entering Milan city center.
Although high by European standards, Milan is one of the big cities with the lowest number of motor vehicles per capita in Italy, with 543 per 1000 people in 2011.

Car sharing

Several car-sharing systems are active in the city. GuidaMi, the first scheme, is managed by ATM and comprises 132 vehicles and about 5,500 registered users. Car2go was activated in August 2013 and has a fleet of 700 cars and more than 50,000 registered users. 
Other services include E-vai from Trenord, DriveNow from BMW, Twist and Enjoy from Eni.
In 2015 the Chinese automaker ZD introduced its Sharen'go electric car-sharing service to Milan, making it the first city outside the company's native China where the service was available.

Car sharing in Milan serves about 0.5% of the total mobility of the city, and with 323,000 users, as of June 2016 it is the Italian city with the largest number of car sharing customers.

Cycling

The city's mostly flat topography favors cycling. The cycle routes network is still limited, but is being constantly expanded. Milan was also one of the first Italian cities to activate a bike sharing system.

Airports

Milan's airport system is the second busiest in Italy, after that of Rome. The city is served by three major airports: Malpensa Airport, the biggest in northern Italy; Linate Airport, located near the city centre and mainly used for domestic traffic; and Orio al Serio Airport, located in the neighbouring city of Bergamo, used mainly by low-cost airlines. Combined, these three airports transported a total of 43 million passengers in 2017. Milano Bresso, operated by Aero Club Milano, is a minor general aviation airport.

The three major airports are connected by bus to the city center. In addition, Malpensa has a direct rail connection to central railway stations in Milan (notably Centrale and Cadorna) via the Malpensa Express service. Upon completion of Metro line 4, Linate airport will also gain a fixed rail connection to Milan city center and the city's south-western districts.

See also

Azienda Trasporti Milanesi
Integrated ticketing in Lombardy
Milan Metro
Milan Passerby Railway
Milan Suburban Railway Network
List of rapid transit systems
List of suburban and commuter rail systems

References

Bibliography
Francesco Ogliari, Storia dei Trasporti Lombardi, vol.1 - Dall'Omnibus alla Metropolitana, Milano, Cavallotti Editori, 1976.

External links
ATM - Milan's Transportation Company
Milan Public Transport - English website
City of Milan - official website
MSR Milano - Unofficial website with the extension projects
Metro5 Milano - official website of the Line M5
CityRailways - list of maps of italian transport systems, including Milan

 
Metropolitan City of Milan

id:Sistem Transportasi Milan